40 Entre Las 2 is the first album by the K-Narias, a project that is born to vindicate, in the letters of their songs, the defense of the woman, despised by some Latin interpreters. The urban rates of their music and the canary accent serve them to fight against the aggressions to the women. In this sense, Gara and Loida carry out the campaign "No a la violencia de género", against the bad treatments and directed mainly to the young people, through a song called "Todos Tenemos Que Luchar", composed and interpreted by this group and they also have a video for it realized by Eddy Cardellach.

40 Entre Las 2 sold 50,000 copies in the Canary Islands (the most sold in the Islands in the last ten years) in only three months.

Track listing
 Intro 
 Yo soy tu hombre (featuring Nicky Jam) 
 No te vistas que no vas
 En este infierno (featuring Voltio)
 Despierta (featuring Don Chezina)
 Ya llegó el reggaeton
 Quiero que bailen (featuring Pedro Prez)
 Tú te entregas a mi
 Provocándome (featuring Mr. Phillips)
 Beso volando (featuring Barbero)
 Manos arriba
 Necesito decirte algo (Balada)

References

External links
Official site
http://acharts.us/album/38992

2005 debut albums
Reggaeton albums
Albums produced by Luny Tunes
Albums produced by Noriega